is a 1933 Japanese silent drama film directed by Kenji Mizoguchi. It is based on the story of the same name by Kyōka Izumi.

Plot
Tomo, called "Shiraito", is a "mizugei" (water arts presented by a performer) artist touring with a circus troupe based in Kanazawa. After an encounter with coachman Kinya, she falls in love with him and decides to finance his law studies, which he can't afford himself. Kinya takes up his studies in Tokyo, regularly receiving money with Shiraito's letters, who hopes that some day they will be reunited.

Two years later, the troupe has gone broke after the Winter season and the present audience being too small to pay for their expenses. As the troupe's bookkeeper, Shiraito gives the last money to young couple Nadeshiko and Shinzō to help them elope from the schemings of knife thrower Minami, who sold Nadeshiko to loan shark Iwabuchi. Shiraito goes to Iwabuchi herself and manages to borrow 300 yen from him in return for sexual services. On her way back, she is robbed by a group of men. As one of the men left behind a knife used by Minami in his act, she realises that the robbery was a set-up by Minami and Iwabuchi. She returns to Iwabuchi to confront him and, when he tries to rape her, stabs him to death. Seizing the money which Minami's men had taken from her, she escapes.

Shiraito flees to Tokyo to see Kinya once again, but he is not at home when she shows up at his address. When she is finally arrested and taken to court for murder in Kanazawa, the prosecutor sent from Tokyo is none other than Kinya. After he learns of the circumstances of the crime and that Shiraito had wanted the money for him, he offers to resign and stand in trial for her. Yet Shiraito insists that he does his duty, as his becoming a respected lawyer was all she had lived for in the past years. After her hearing in court, she commits suicide by biting off her tongue, and Kinya shoots himself with a pistol.

Cast
 Irie Takako as Tomo Mizushima/Taki no shiraito
 Tokihiko Okada as Kinya Murakoshi
 Suzuko Taki as Nadeshiko
 Ichirō Sugai as Gozo Iwabuchi
 Kōju Murata as Minami
 Mimyo Bontarō as Shinzō
 Kumeko Urabe as Ogin
 Kōji Ōizumi as Gonji
 Minoru Ōhara as Tanjirō
 Nobuo Kosaka as Takamura
 Etsuji Oki as Old detective
 Kōji Kawase

Background
The Water Magician was the second film adaptation (after 1915) of Kyōka Izumi's story, and one in a series of dramatisations of his work by director Mizoguchi. It was produced by Takako Irie's own production company, Irie Production, the first female star film production company. It premiered in Japan on 1 June 1933.

Legacy
In his review for the online edition of Sight and Sound magazine, film scholar Alexander Jacoby called The Water Magician an "extraordinary" film, which "already reveals the director's skill with the camera" and benefits from actress Irie Takako's "magnetic performance".

The Water Magician is still occasionally being shown with live benshi narration by Midori Sawato, Ichirō Kataoka, Komura Tomoko, and others.

Notes

References

External links
 

1933 films
Japanese silent films
Japanese black-and-white films
Films directed by Kenji Mizoguchi
Japanese drama films
1933 drama films
Silent drama films
Films based on short fiction